Fiddlesticks is a 1930 Celebrity Pictures theatrical cartoon short directed and animated by Ub Iwerks, in his first cartoon since he departed from Walt Disney's studio. The short features Iwerks' character Flip the Frog. It is the first complete sound cartoon to be photographed in color. The film went into the public domain after the copyright owner failed to renew the copyright after the film's 28 year term.

The film was simultaneously released with King of Jazz, a musical revue, and was released with a cartoon depicting how Paul Whiteman, the music director of the film, "became the King of Jazz".

Plot synopsis
Flip is seen dancing on lilypads until he reaches land and dries himself off. He walks to a party, where he performs a dance for the audience, accidentally climbing to a spider web. He also performs a duet, playing piano alongside a mouse (who bears a striking resemblance to Mickey Mouse, which Iwerks co-created with Walt Disney during his days at Disney's company) playing the violin. They perform two songs. In the first song, the mouse starts crying, and so do Flip and the piano. The second song makes Flip start hugging the piano, which then kicks Flip. The cartoon ends with Flip beating on the piano; he kicks all the piano keys into the air, and they drop onto him.

Significance
Fiddlesticks was the first in the Flip the Frog series. The sound system was Powers Cinephone, the same system used for Disney's Steamboat Willie (1928).

The unnamed mouse in the cartoon bears a striking resemblance to Mortimer Mouse, the original concept behind Mickey Mouse, both of whom were first animated by Ub Iwerks.

In popular culture
The cartoon appeared on a television set in the music video for Eminem's song "The Real Slim Shady", which the viewer laughs at.

References

External links
 
 
 

1930 films
1930s color films
1930s animated short films
Films directed by Ub Iwerks
Animated films without speech
1930 animated films
1930s American animated films
American animated short films
Animated films about animals
Films scored by Carl Stalling
Films about frogs
Animated films about mice
1930s English-language films